Kolchin (Russian: Колчин) is a Russian masculine surname originating from the given name Nikolai (Nicholas); its feminine counterpart is Kolchina. The surname may refer to the following notable people:
Alevtina Kolchina (born 1930), Soviet cross-country skier
Denys Kolchin (born 1977), Ukrainian football defender and manager
Ellis Kolchin (1916–1991), American mathematician
Lie–Kolchin theorem
Kolchin topology
Fjodor Koltšin (1957–2018), Estonian cross-country skier, son of Alevtina and Pavel
Nataliya Kolchina (born 1939), Soviet long track speed skater
Pavel Kolchin (1930–2010), Soviet cross-country skier, husband of Alevtina
Peter Kolchin (born 1943), American historian
Yuri Kolchin (born 1976), Russian football player

References

Russian-language surnames